Augustus Hill Garland (June 11, 1832  –  January 26, 1899) was an American lawyer and Democratic politician from Arkansas, who initially opposed Arkansas' secession from the United States, but later served in both houses of the Congress of the Confederate States and the United States Senate, as well as becoming the 11th governor of Arkansas (1874-1877) and the 38th attorney general of the United States (1885-1889).

Early life
Garland was born in Covington, Tennessee on June 11, 1832, to Rufus and Barbara (Hill) Garland. His parents moved to Lost Prairie in Arkansas the following year. In 1830 his father owned 13 slaves, and owned a store before dying when Augustus was a child. In 1836 his mother married Thomas Hubbard. Hubbard moved the family to Washington, Arkansas, near the Hempstead County seat of Hope, and owned 5 slaves in the 1850 census.

Garland attended Spring Hill Male Academy from 1838 to 1843. He attended St. Mary's College in Lebanon, Kentucky, and graduated from St. Joseph's College in Bardstown, Kentucky, in 1849.

Garland taught at Brownstown School in Mine Creek, Sevier County, but returned to Washington to study law with Hempstead County clerk Simon Sanders. He married Sarah Virginia Sanders on June 14, 1853; they would have nine children, four of whom survived to adulthood.

Early legal career

Admitted to the bar in 1853, Garland started his law practice with his stepfather. Garland moved to Little Rock in June 1856, and became a law partner to Ebenezer Cummins, a former associate of Albert Pike. When Cummins died, Garland took over his extensive practice at age 25 and took on slightly younger attorney William Randolph by 1860, who lived with Garland's young family. Garland owned three enslaved females in the 1860 census (two 27 years old and an 11-year-old girl), and his elder brother Rufus owned 9 slaves in Hempstead County, Arkansas. Nonetheless, Augustus Garland represented the slave Abby Guy in two appeals to the Arkansas Supreme Court in 1857 and 1861, ultimately winning her freedom.
Garland became one of Arkansas's most prominent attorneys and was admitted to the bar of the Supreme Court of the United States in 1860.

Entry into politics
Garland supported the Whig and American "Know Nothing" parties during the 1850s. In the election of 1860, Garland was a presidential elector in the Arkansas Electoral College for the Constitutional Union Party voting for the party's nominees of John Bell and Edward Everett.

American Civil War
The election of Republican Abraham Lincoln to the Presidency of the United States led to the secession of the Deep South states from the Union. Garland consistently opposed secession and advocated Arkansas's continued allegiance to the United States. His elder brother Rufus Garland (1830-1886) raised a Confederate infantry company (the "Hempstead Hornets") and accepted a captain's commission. Augustus Garland was selected to represent Pulaski County at the 1861 secession convention in Little Rock, where he voiced his opposition. After Lincoln called for 75,000 troops from Arkansas to help suppress the Confederate States, Garland reluctantly gave his support to secession.

Confederate States Congress
Garland was appointed to the Provisional Confederate Congress and was elected to the Confederate House of Representatives in the 1st Confederate States Congress in 1861, where he was a member of the Committees on Public Lands, Commerce and Financial Independence, and the Judiciary. He was reelected in 1863, and in 1864 was appointed to the Confederate States Senate to fill the vacancy caused by the death of Charles B. Mitchel. As a Congressman, he made efforts to establish a Supreme Court of the Confederate States and supported President Jefferson Davis, with the exception of Davis' aside suspending the writ of habeas corpus for the duration of the war (as had Lincoln in the North). He returned to Arkansas in February 1865, when it was clear the Confederacy was about to lose so that he could help facilitate the return of his state to the Union.

Postwar

Ex parte Garland
Not long after the Civil War ended, President Andrew Johnson pardoned Garland on July 15, 1865. He was nonetheless forbidden to resume his legal practice without taking the Ironclad Oath, which the United States Congress had required of all Confederate government or military officials, per a law passed on January 24, 1865. In Ex parte Garland, Garland argued that the law was unconstitutional and ex post facto. On January 14, 1867, by a vote of five to four, the U.S. Supreme Court agreed. The ruling caused considerable uproar in the north, but former Confederates hoped that the judicial system could be used to prevent the implementation of Congressional Reconstruction. Garland then pushed the Supreme Court to hear the case of Mississippi v. Johnson which challenged the constitutionality of those acts; however, the Court refused.

Political career

Arkansas legislators elected him to the United States Senate for a term beginning in 1867 but was not allowed to take the seat because Arkansas had not yet been readmitted to the Union. Garland in 1869 helped found the Southern Historical Society and gathered papers of Arkansas Confederate veterans. As he resumed his legal practice, Garland observed politics from a distance. In 1872, with the Republican Party split into three factions, Arkansas Democrats sought Garland to help elect Democrats into the state legislature and had been considered for the Democratic nomination for the U.S. Senate. During the conflict known as the Brooks-Baxter War, Garland became a primary strategist for Governor Elisha Baxter and briefly served as the secretary of state. He was an advisor and constitutional scholar at the next state constitutional convention and, with strong support from the Democratic Party, was elected Governor of Arkansas.

Governor of Arkansas
Garland was faced with a number of problems after taking office as Governor including turmoil in the state over threatening groups like the Ku Klux Klan, an ongoing congressional investigation over the Brooks-Baxter conflict and the state debt of $17,000,000. With help from the finance board, the debt was significantly lowered in two years time. Garland was a strong supporter of better education. He urged the legislature to establish schools for the blind and deaf, successfully advocated in appointing a new president for the Arkansas Industrial University, today the University of Arkansas, and helped found the Branch Normal College, today the University of Arkansas at Pine Bluff, which made education more accessible for African-Americans. Under his administration, he also oversaw the creation of the Arkansas Bureau of Statistics and the Arkansas Bureau of Agriculture, Mining and Manufacturing.

United States Senate
Garland ran successfully for the United States Senate in 1876, thus succeeded Republican Powell Clayton. Voters re-elected him in 1883. In the Senate, he served as a member of the Committees on Public Lands, the Territories and the Judiciary, serving as chairman of the Territories Committee in the 46th Congress. As a Senator, he made efforts to bring about tariff reform, internal improvements, as well as the regulation of interstate commerce and a federal prison system, federal aid to education and civil service reform.

Attorney General of the United States
Garland resigned from the Senate in 1885 after accepting the appointment of Attorney General of the United States by newly elected President Grover Cleveland, becoming the first Arkansan to receive a cabinet post.

Not long after taking office, Garland became embroiled in a political scandal. While serving in the Senate, Garland became a shareholder in and attorney for the Pan-Electric Telephone Company which was organized to form regional telephone companies using equipment developed by J. Harris Rogers. The Bell Telephone Company brought suit against Pan-Electric for patent infringement after it was discovered that their equipment was similar to that of Bell's. Garland was ordered to bring a suit in the name of the United States to invalidate the Bell patent, breaking their monopoly of telephone technology, but refused to do so. However, while Garland was on vacation in the summer, Solicitor General John Goode authorized the suit.

A year-long congressional investigation and constant public attention affected his work as Attorney General, however, despite having to serve under a cloud of suspicion, he was supported by President Cleveland. Garland was also the first, and to date only, United States cabinet secretary to be censured by Congress when, in 1886, Garland failed to provide documents about the firing of a United States Attorney.

Later life and death
President Cleveland lost reelection to Benjamin Harrison in the 1888 election and Garland left office at the end of Cleveland's term in 1889. He resumed practicing law in Washington, D.C. and published a number of books, including The Constitution As It Is (1880), Experience in the Supreme Court of the United States, with Some Reflections and Suggestions as to that Tribunal (1883), Third-Term Presidential (1896), Experience in the Supreme Court of the United States (1898) and  Treatise on the Constitution and Jurisdiction of the United States Courts (1898). On January 26, 1899, while arguing a case before the Supreme Court, Garland suffered a stroke and died a few hours later in the Capitol. He was interred at Mount Holly Cemetery in Little Rock, Arkansas.

Legacy
Garland County, Arkansas, was named after him as was Garland, Texas and Garland, North Carolina.

See also
 List of Confederate States senators
 List of governors of Arkansas
 List of people from Tennessee
 List of people pardoned or granted clemency by the president of the United States
 List of United States senators from Arkansas

References

Further reading

External links

Augustus Hill Garland at Encyclopedia of Arkansas

Augustus Hill Garland at the National Governors Association
Augustus Hill Garland at the Old State House Museum

1832 births
1899 deaths
People from Covington, Tennessee
Cleveland administration cabinet members
United States Attorneys General
Arkansas Whigs
Arkansas Know Nothings
Arkansas Constitutional Unionists
1860 United States presidential electors
Deputies and delegates to the Provisional Congress of the Confederate States
Members of the Confederate House of Representatives from Arkansas
Confederate States of America senators
Democratic Party United States senators from Arkansas
Democratic Party governors of Arkansas
Governors of Arkansas
Arkansas lawyers
American slave owners
Politicians from Little Rock, Arkansas
People from Hempstead County, Arkansas
Garland County, Arkansas
People of Arkansas in the American Civil War
Recipients of American presidential pardons
Burials at Mount Holly Cemetery
Southern Historical Society
United States senators who owned slaves